Carlton Cinema may refer to:

 Carlton Cinema, cinema in Toronto
 Carlton Cinema (TV channel), British TV channel 1998–2003
 Carlton Cinema, Dublin, former cinema
 Carlton Cinema, Essex Road, London